Gertrude of Flanders (c. 1070–1117), was a Countess of Louvain and Landgravine of Brabant by marriage to Henry III, Count of Leuven, and a Duchess of Lorraine by marriage to Theodoric II, Duke of Lorraine. At the time the duchy was the upper Lorraine, since 959 separated from the duchy of Lower Lorraine.

Life
Gertrude was daughter of Robert I, Count of Flanders and Gertrude of Saxony. Robert was son of Baldwin V of Flanders and Adèle, a daughter of King Robert II of France, and Gertrude daughter of the Duke of Saxony.  She was sister of Robert II, Count of Flanders (c. 1065 – 1111), "Robert the Crusader".

Leuven and Brabant
Gertrude married firstly Henry III, Count of Leuven (died wounded in a tournament in Tournai in 1095), of the House of Reginar. He was count of Louvain from 1078 to 1095 and landgrave of Brabant from 1085. At Henry's death, his brother Godfrey I succeeded as count and landgrave. From 1106 he also became duke of Lower Lorraine.

They had four children, probably all daughters (born about 1092-1096), assumingly including:
Adelaide (d. 1158), wife of duke Simon I of Lorraine (1076 – 1138), son of her stepfather Theodoric with Hedwige (d. c. 1090). 
Gertrude, wife to Lambert, count of Montaigu and Clermont.

Lorraine
Secondly in 1096 she married Theodoric II, Duke of Lorraine "Thierry" (d. 1115), son of Gérard of Alsace, Count of Metz, Duke of Lorraine (-1070), of the House of Lorraine-Alsace. Thierry was a widower with a son Simon, and a daughter Gertrude.
They had the following issue:
 Thierry of Alsace "Theodoric" (c. 1099 – 1168), lord of Bitche, also Count of Flanders from 1128. Married to Sibylla of Anjou, and father to Margaret I, Countess of Flanders and Matthew, Count of Boulogne
Henry I (d. 1165), bishop of Toul
Ida, married Sigefroy (d. 1104), count of Burghausen
Ermengarde, married Bernard III Gros de Brancion (fr)
Gisela, married Frederick, count of Saarbrücken.

Ancestry

See also
Dukes of Lorraine family tree

References

Sources

House of Flanders
House of Reginar
House of Metz
House of Billung
1070s births
1117 deaths
Year of birth uncertain
11th-century French nobility
11th-century French women
11th-century German nobility
11th-century German women
12th-century German nobility
12th-century German women